Aechmea gracilis is a plant species in the genus Aechmea. This species is endemic to southeastern Brazil from Rio de Janeiro State to Santa Catarina.

Cultivars
 Aechmea 'Ilha Grande'
 Aechmea 'Magpie'

References

gracilis
Flora of Brazil
Plants described in 1891